Kirkby Stephen is a civil parish in the Eden District, Cumbria, England.  It contains 52 listed buildings that are recorded in the National Heritage List for England.  Of these, one is listed at Grade II*, the middle of the three grades, and the others are at Grade II, the lowest grade.  The parish contains the market town of Kirkby Stephen and the surrounding countryside.  Most of the listed buildings are shops, houses, and associated structures in the town.  The River Eden flows through the parish, and two bridges crossing it are listed.  The other listed buildings include a church and a portico at the entrance to the churchyard, a former grammar school, a church hall, hotels, a barn, a former Temperance Hall, a bridge crossing a former railway, a war memorial, and a bank.


Key

Buildings

References

Citations

Sources

Lists of listed buildings in Cumbria
Listed buildings in